Jean-Yves Escoffier (12 July 1950 – 1 April 2003) was a French cinematographer. For his work on films by Leos Carax, Escoffier received the European Film Award for Best Cinematographer and was nominated for the César Award for Best Cinematography.

Career
Escoffier worked as director of photography on a number of films of Leos Carax including Boy Meets Girl, Mauvais sang, and Les Amants du Pont-Neuf, on a number of European and American feature films including The Human Stain, Possession, Nurse Betty, Cradle Will Rock, Rounders, and Good Will Hunting, as well as Harmony Korine's Gummo.

He also worked with Mehdi Norowzian, Jeanne Moreau for Air France, David Lynch for Nissan Motors, and on music videos, "Hurt" (2002) for Johnny Cash and Mark Romanek.

On 1 April 2003, Escoffier died from a heart attack in his home in Los Angeles, California during post-production of The Human Stain, a film since dedicated to his memory.

Filmography

As cinematographer

Film

Music videos

Other credits

References

Sources

External links
 
 

1950 births
2003 deaths
European Film Award for Best Cinematographer winners
French cinematographers
People from Los Angeles
Mass media people from Lyon